James Dime (December 19, 1897 – May 11, 1981), nicknamed Sheik of Spring Street, was a Yugoslavian-American professional boxer and actor known for The Last Hurrah (1958), So Big (1953), Steel Town (1952), Anne of the Indies (1951), Sudan (1945), The Seventh Cross (1944), Crazy House (1943), Stand and Deliver (1928), The King of Kings (1927) as a Roman soldier and Keep 'Em Sailing (1942).

He worked mostly in anonymity. He was injured falling from a tower while shooting The Lives of a Bengal Lancer (1935). He doubled Monte Blue on Hawk of the Wilderness (1938).

Filmography

References

External links 

 

1897 births
1981 deaths
Yugoslav male film actors
Yugoslav male television actors
American male film actors
American male television actors
Yugoslav emigrants to the United States
20th-century American male actors